Sandip University  is a private university and UGC recognised, located in Nashik, Maharashtra, India. The university was established In 2017 what was formerly a campus in Sijoul, Madhubani district, Bihar, became a separate private university, Sandip University, Sijoul. It offers various undergraduate and postgraduate courses.

The University has a world-class infrastructure with a vast 250+ acres Wi-Fi enabled campus, 24*7 security facilities. The campus has modern library housing more than 1,00,000 books, computers and spacious seating arrangements. Other on-campus facilities include transport, hygienic canteens, travel, saloon, gymnasium, swimming-pool, ambulance facilities, to name a few. Students' welfare is boosted by 21 SUN (Sandip University, Nashik) Clubs that are created “For the Students & By the Students”.

Schools 

 
School of Engineering & Technology
 School of Computer Sciences & Engineering
 School of Design (UX Design)
 School of Law
 School of Commerce & Management Studies
 School of Pharmaceutical Science
 School of Sciences
 School of Fashion Design & Beauty Cosmetology
 School of Interior Design

References

External links
 

Private universities in India
Universities in Maharashtra
Education in Nashik
Educational institutions established in 2015
2015 establishments in Maharashtra